The 1976 Paris–Nice was the 34th edition of the Paris–Nice cycle race and was held from 7 March to 14 March 1976. The race started in Paris and finished in Nice. The race was won by Michel Laurent of the Miko–de Gribaldy team.

General classification

References

1976
1976 in road cycling
1976 in French sport
March 1976 sports events in Europe
1976 Super Prestige Pernod